The 1977–78 Arkansas Razorbacks men's basketball team represented the University of Arkansas. The head coach was Eddie Sutton. He coached the Razorbacks from the 1974-1975 season until the 1984-1985 season. During his tenure as head coach, the Razorbacks ended the season either first or tied for first in the Southwest Conference five times. Under Sutton, the Razorbacks were invited to the NCAA tournament nine times. Sutton's most successful season was 1977-78 when the team reached the Final Four. The Razorbacks lost in the semifinals to the Kentucky Wildcats 64-59 at the Checkerdome arena in St. Louis, Missouri. Arkansas defeated Notre Dame 71-69 in the Third-Place game, which was the last time the Third-Place game was played.

Roster

Schedule and Results 

|-
!colspan=12 style=| Regular season

|-
!colspan=12 style=| SWC tournament

|-
!colspan=12 style=| NCAA tournament

Achievements 
Sutton left as head coach after the 1984-85 season with a Conference record of 139-35 (79.9%). He would go on to coach three more schools (Kentucky, Oklahoma State, and San Francisco) and retire in 2008. He was inducted into the College Basketball Hall of Fame in 2011.

Ron Brewer was the Southwest Conference Men's Basketball Player of the Year. He became the 7th overall pick by the Portland Trail Blazers in the 1978 NBA Draft.

Sidney Moncrief was drafted the following year by the Milwaukee Bucks 5th overall in the 1979 NBA Draft, and became a five time NBA All-Star and was awarded a spot on the All-NBA First Team in 1983. His jersey was retired by the Bucks.

Marvin Delph was drafted the same year as Brewer but in the 3rd round (65th overall) by the Buffalo Braves and then drafted again the next year by the Boston Celtics in the 6th round of the 1979 NBA draft along with Moncrief but never played in the NBA.

U. S. Reed was drafted in the 5th round (104th overall pick) in the 1981 NBA draft by the Kansas City Kings, but never played in the NBA.

References 

Arkansas Razorbacks men's basketball seasons
1970s in sports
Arkansas
Arkansas
NCAA Division I men's basketball tournament Final Four seasons
1977 in sports in Arkansas
1978 in sports in Arkansas